Gampalagudem is a village in NTR district of the Indian state of Andhra Pradesh. It is the headquarters of Gampalagudem mandal administered under Tiruvuru revenue division.

Government and politics 
Gampalagudem falls under the administration of Gampalagudem Gram panchayat. It is in turn a part of Gampalagudem mandal, a constituency mandal of Tiruvuru Assembly constituency. The constituency is also a part of Andhra Pradesh's Vijayawada Lok Sabha constituency.

Demographics 
 Census of India, Gampalagudem had a total population of 8,256 of which 4,175 were male and 4,081 female—a sex ratio of 978 females per 1000 males. There were 776 children in the 0–6 year age group of which 417 were boys and 359 girls. The average literacy rate stands at 70.99% with 5,310 literates, higher than the district average of 73.70%.

Economy 

Agriculture is the main occupation of the village. The Mango orchards in and around the village are in abundant with Banginapalli, Totapuri varieties.

Transport 

It has road connectivity with other towns and villages with Madhira – Tiruvuru and Gampalagudem - Cheemalapadu road passes through the village. Gampalagudem has no rail transport. Madhira is the nearest railway station to the village. It is administered under Secunderabad railway division of the South Central Railway zone.

Education 
Gampalagudem has several educational institutions including Degree College, Junior Inter College, ZP High school and various private schools.

See also 
List of villages in Krishna district

References 

Villages in NTR district
Mandal headquarters in NTR district